The AEG G.IV was a biplane bomber aircraft used in World War I by Germany. It was developed from the AEG G.III, with refinements to power, bomb-load and dimensions. Coming into service in late 1916, it featured a bomb capacity twice as large as that of the AEG G.II, but was still considered inadequate in terms of offensive capacity and performance. Further improvements led to the development of the G.V, but the Armistice came before the replacement could become operational. Serving late in the war, the AEG G.IV managed to achieve some operational success in reconnaissance and combat roles.

Design and development
The Allgemeine Elektricitäts-Gesellschaft (A.E.G.) G.IV was derived from the earlier G.III. Designed as a tactical bomber, the relatively modern technology included onboard radios and electrically heated suits for the crew. Unlike the other German twin-engined Großflugzeug-class ("G") bombers such as the Gotha G.V and the Friedrichshafen G.III, the AEG featured an all-metal, welded-tube frame, making it a more rugged aircraft. Well equipped with armament, although the rear gunner's cockpit was on the top of the fuselage, the position was equipped with a hinged window in the floor for viewing and fending off pursuing aircraft.
 
The AEG G.IV medium bomber was converted into an armored, antitank gunship, the G.IVk (Kanone) with two 20 mm Becker cannon. It never saw service.

Operational history

The AEG G.IV bomber entered service with the German Air Force in late 1916. Because of its relatively short range, the G.IV served mainly as a tactical bomber, operating close to the front lines. The G.IV flew both day and night operations in France, Romania, Greece and Italy, but, as the war progressed, the AEG G.IV was restricted increasingly to night missions. Many night operations were considered nuisance raids with no specific targets, but with the intention of disrupting enemy activity at night and perhaps doing some collateral damage.

The AEG G.IV carried a warload of 400 kg (880 lb). While Gotha crews struggled to keep their heavy aircraft aloft, the AEG was renowned as an easy aircraft to fly. Some G.IV crews of Kampfgeschwader 4 are known to have flown up to seven combat missions a night on the Italian front. A notable mission involved Hauptmann Hermann Köhl attacking the railroad sheds in Padua, Italy in his G.IV bomber.

Survivor

A single example (number 574/18) is preserved at the Canada Aviation and Space Museum. This example is significant not only as the only one of its kind in existence, but as the only preserved German, twin-engined combat aircraft from World War I. The aircraft was brought to Canada in 1919 as a war trophy. It has been at the museum since 1970.

Variants
AEG G.IV
Tactical bomber
AEG G.IVg
Fitted with an increased span three-bay wing.
AEG G.IVk
Armoured ground-attack aircraft fitted with two 20 mm Becker cannon, one in a dorsal mounting and one in a turret under the nose. Five built.

Operators

Luftstreitkräfte

Specifications (AEG G.IV)

See also

References

Notes

Citations

Bibliography
 Grey, Peter and Owen Thetford. German Aircraft of the First World War. London: Putnam, 1962. .

 Molson, Kenneth M. Canada's National Aviation Museum: Its History and Collections. Ottawa, Canada: National Museum of Science and Technology, 1988. .
 Munson, Kenneth. Aircraft of World War I. Shepperton, UK: Ian Allan, 1967. .
 Sharpe, Michael. Biplanes, Triplanes, and Seaplanes. London: Friedman/Fairfax Books, 2000. .
 Williams, Anthony G. and Emmanuel Gustin. Flying Guns: World War I and its Aftermath 1914–32. Ramsbury, Wiltshire, UK: Airlife Publishing, 2003. .

External links

 Plan 1919
 A.E.G. G.IV

G.IV
1910s German bomber aircraft
Aircraft first flown in 1916